López Sicardó is one out of 3 sectors in Oriente.

References

Oriente, San Juan, Puerto Rico
Municipality of San Juan